The 2010 Isle of Man TT Festival was held between Saturday 29 May and Friday 11 June on the 37.73-mile Isle of Man TT Mountain Course. The 2010 races again included a second 600 cc Supersport Junior TT race. The Lightweight TT and Ultra-Lightweight TT race class previously held on the  Billown Circuit in the Isle of Man for the 2008 Isle of Man TT and 2009 Isle of Man TT were dropped from the 2010 race schedule. The 2010 Isle of Man TT Races included the one-lap TT Zero for racing motorcycles "to be powered without the use of carbon based fuels and have zero toxic/noxious emissions." which replaced the TTXGP and also a Suzuki 50th Anniversary Lap of Honour and the TT Classic Parade which were held before the main Senior TT race.

The Blue Riband event of the 2010 TT Race week the Senior TT run over a reduced race distance after the race was red-flagged on lap 3 after an incident at Ballagarey on the TT Course involving Guy Martin and caused a number of protective hay-bails to be set alight. The 2010 Isle of Man TT Races provided a clean-sweep of the solo motorcycle classes for Ian Hutchinson winning five Isle of Man TT races in a week, including the Senior TT race, the Superport and Superstock TT races, the six lap Superbike TT race and also winning the prestigious Joey Dunlop 2010 Isle of Man TT Championship. The previous record for four race wins in a week completed during the 1996 Isle of Man TT was held by Phillip McCallen. During the 2010 Isle of Man TT Races, Ian Hutchinson also completed a Junior/Senior double win and completed two Isle of Man TT race wins in one day, winning the Supersport TT Race 1 and the Superstock TT races for the second consecutive year.

The 2010 Sidecar TT Race 1 proved to be a first-time win for the former World Sidecar champion Klaus Klaffenböck and the first Austrian winner of an Isle of Man TT race since Rupert Hollaus won the 1954 Ultra-Lightweight TT held on the Clypse Course. The sidecar crew of Klaus Klaffenböck/Dan Sayle also won the 2010 Sidecar TT Race 1 and the 2010 Sidecar TT Championship. The closely contested 2010 TT Privateers Championship was won by James McBride.

Another first-time winner during the 2010 Isle of Man TT races was Mark Miller from the United States after winning the inaugural TT Zero race with a battery-powered, electric motor-driven MotoCzysz E1pc motorcycle and the first United States winner since Dave Roper won the 1984 Historic TT riding a 500 cc Matchless. The MotoCzysz E1pc was also the first American-manufactured motorcycle to win an Isle of Man TT Race since Oliver Godfrey won the 1911 Senior TT with an Indian V-Twin motorcycle.

During the 2010 Supersport TT Race 2, the New Zealand competitor Paul Dobbs crashed fatally at Ballagarey and the Austrian Martin Loicht died in an accident at Quarry Bends during the same race. The 2010 Post-TT Races held on the Billown Circuit, the solo motorcycle races were won by William Dunlop with a Hat-trick of wins in the 125 cc, 250 cc and 600 cc classes. The 400 cc and 650 cc Twins class were run concurrently with other races; both classes were won by Roy Richardson to give a double win at the 2010 Post-TT Races.

The 2010 Isle of Man TT formed the subject of the 2011 documentary TT3D: Closer to the Edge.

Pre-TT Classic 2010

The traditional curtain-raiser since 1988 to the Isle of Man TT Festival has been the Pre-TT Classic Races held on the  Billown Circuit in Castletown. The first evening practice session for the 2010 Pre-TT Classic Races were held on Friday 28 May 2010 in cold and blustery conditions. The fastest time in the first Friday practice session was set by the Isle of Man TT competitor Guy Martin in the Post Classic class in 2 minutes and 37.890 seconds at an average speed of 96.903 mph. The Senior class was dominated by Alan Oversby debuting a 500 cc MV Agusta on the Billown Circuit at an average speed of 91.656 mph. With the highly competitive Junior class, it was Roy Richardson who was fastest in the Friday evening practice riding a 350 cc Aermacchi at an average speed of 84.551 mph and Chris Palmer in second place with a speed of 83.181 mph riding a 350 cc AJS. Fastest time in the Lightweight class was an average speed of 83.603 mph set by Mike Hose riding a 250 cc Ariel Arrow and Vince Biggs/Phil Biggs with a 1000 cc BMW outfit led the practice for the sidecar class at an average speed of 79.287 mph.

The first race of the 2010 Pre-TT Classic Races was the 350 cc Singles event held on Saturday 30 May 2010 and run in light rain and drizzle. Despite setting fast-time in practice and storming into the lead on lap 1, Roy Richardson slipped-off at Church Bends on lap 2 in the difficult conditions. This allowed local competitor and TT winner Chris Palmer to win in 19 minutes and 41.282 seconds at an average race speed of 77.712 mph riding a 350 cc AJS motorcycle. The 250 cc class was won by Ted Fenwick riding a Ducati at an average race speed of 69.279 mph.

Racing for the 2010 Pre-TT Classic recommenced on Monday 31 May 2010 with the 9 lap (38.25 miles) Lightweight Classic race in almost perfect conditions held in bright sunshine and light winds. The leader from the massed-start for the Lightweight race was Ewan Hamilton riding a 242 cc Suzuki leading all 9 laps to win in 27 minutes and 26.926 seconds an average race speed of 83.610 mph. The Senior Classic Race was also a start to finish race for the winner Mike Oversby riding a 500 cc MV Agusta at an average race speed of 90.659 mph. The 6 lap (25.5 miles) Sidecar Classic Race was won by Vince Biggs/Phil Biggs with a 1000 cc BMW outfit at an average race speed of 80.509 mph with only two competitors running at the finish.

Recommencing after the lunch break was the Junior Classic race and the winner was Mike Hose riding a 350 cc Honda at average race speed of 85.796 mph. The penultimate race was the Post-Classic Superbike Race and the early leader was the Isle of Man TT race competitor Guy Martin retiring from a comfortable leader on lap 5 and the overall winner and class winner of the Post Classic class was Roy Richardson riding a 247 cc Yamaha TZ at an average race speed of 93.397 mph. The winner of the 850 cc Classic class was Alan Oversby riding a 500 cc Norton at an average race speed of 93.244 mph. The final race of the 2010 Pre-TT Classic was the Support Race and the winner was Bernie Wright riding a 347 cc Yamsel at an average race speed of 82.943 mph.

TT Practice Week 2010

Saturday evening practice

The first practice session for 2010 Isle of Man TT races was due to feature an evening untimed practice session and a Newcomers control lap on Saturday 29 May 2010. Due to inclement weather conditions including light rain and low cloud on the Mountain Section of the course, the untimed session was cancelled by the Race organisers and only the TT Newcomers completed their speed control lap. There was a long delay to the start of the first practice session caused by vehicles on the course, the removal of signage from the Mountain Section and a wait for an improvement in the weather conditions and for better visibility on the Mountain Section. The competitors were a little disappointed about losing the first practice session to the weather and John McGuinness said;- "It would have been good to go out but I don't think we'd have learned a lot in the damp conditions." As with previous years the Newcomers Control Lap was led away from the TT Grandstand by the TT Travelling Marshals and a steady pace set by the accompanying experienced Isle of Man TT and Manx Grand Prix competitors. The first group of Newcomers to leave the TT Grandstand at 8 pm was the former TT winner and Rider's Liaison Officer Richard Quayle with the South African competitor Hudson Kennaugh from Durban, Brandon Cretu from Felton, Pennsylvania, David Johnson from Adelaide and the Swiss competitor Herve Ganther.  Fellow TT Rider's Liaison Officer John Barton accompanied Brian McCormack, the Japanese rider Takahiro Itami and Gary May. The former 2003 Senior Manx Grand Prix winner Paul Duckett led a group of newcomers including Tony Czyzewski, Dan Cooper, the Austrian rider Martin Loicht and Stephen Thompson. The final group of Newcomer solo competitors on their speed control lap were escorted by the 2002 Lightweight Manx Grand Prix winner Nigel Beattie with James Hurrell, David Jones and Clinton Pienaar from Johannesburg. The newcomers control lap a number of outfits for the Sidecar TT were accompanied by experienced TT sidecar competitors Roy Hanks/Dave Wells and John Holden/Andrew Winkle and included TT sidecar newcomers Michael Grambuller/Stefan Trautner from Vienna, the German crew Mike Roscher/Gregory Cluze from Kassel and Roger Stockton/Annette Daykin. The South African competitor Hudson Kennaugh stopped at Douglas Road Corner on the Newcomers Control Lap with technical problems and Clinton Pienaar at the Quarterbridge.

Monday evening practice
The first timed session of the 2010 Isle of Man TT commenced on Monday 31 May 2010 after the Saturday practice session was cancelled by race organisers due to inclement weather. Held in warm overcast conditions, the Monday evening practice session for solo motorcycles commenced promptly at 6:35 pm with Michael Dunlop and Cameron Donald the first competitors away from the TT Grandstand. The fastest time on Monday evening practice was set by Ian Hutchinson on a 1000 cc Honda in the Superbike class in 17 minutes and 38.66 seconds at an average speed of 128.302 mph. The Supersport TT class was dominated by Michael Dunlop and the winner of the 2009 Supersport Race 2 with a lap at an average speed of 123.960 mph riding a 600 cc Yamaha motorcycle. The Superstock TT class was led by Ryan Farquhar riding a 1000 cc Kawasaki at an average speed of 126.799 mph. The Sidecar TT class on Monday evening, the fastest time was set by Klaus Klaffenböck/Dan Sayle with a 600 cc LCR Honda outfit in 20 minutes and 15.35 seconds at an average speed of 111.761 mph.

Tuesday evening practice
After overnight rain the Tuesday practice session was held in ideal conditions and warm evening sunshine with damp patches reported on the many tree lined sections of the course including Glen Helen and the Ramsey Hairpin. The practice session was again dominated by Ian Hutchinson in the Superbike class setting at an average speed of 128.017 mph and 2.36 seconds slower than the mark set on Monday evening. It was Michael Dunlop that was again set the fastest time in the Supersport class at an average speed of 122.278 mph. The Superstock class the fastest time was again by Ian Hutchinson riding a 1000 cc Honda at 126.339 mph and just 3.9 seconds slower than the time set by Ryan Farquhar on the previous night. In the Sidecar class the first lap under 20 minutes was recorded by Dave Molyneux/Patrick Farrance with a 600 cc DMR Kawasaki outfit in 19 minutes and 47.77 seconds an average speed of 114.355 mph to lead the Sidecar TT practice times. At Keppel Gate during Tuesday evening practice, Chris Bradshaw suffered a shoulder injury and the American competitor James Vanderhaar walked into the TT Grandstand after an incident at Governor's Bridge. The local Isle of Man side crew of Glyn Jones/Jason O'Connor following an accident at Lambfell Mooar on Creg Willey's Hill sustained ankle and hand friction burns.

Wednesday evening practice
The Wednesday evening practice session held on 2 June 2010 was run in almost perfect conditions and without most of the damp road patches which had caused problems to competitors the previous evening. In the Superbike class, the first 130 mph lap was recorded in practice for the 2010 Isle of Man TT races by John McGuinness riding a 1000 cc Honda in 17 minutes and 22.89 seconds an average race speed of 130.242 mph to move to the top of the practice Superbike/Senior TT leaderboard. The 600 cc Supersport class continued to be dominated by Michael Dunlop lapping the Mountain Course in 18 minutes and 5.87 seconds an average speed of 125.087 mph and 9.87 seconds faster than his time recorded on Monday practice. For the Superstock class there was further improvements in practice times with Ryan Farquhar also 10.69 seconds faster than his time on the Monday evening practice, recording an average speed of 128.076 mph. After winning the Superstock class at the 2010 North West 200 Races, the 1000 cc BMW ridden by Keith Amor moved into second place on the Superstock TT leaderboard, with a lap at an average speed of 127.525 mph during Wednesday evening practice. For the Sidecar TT, the 600 cc DMR Kawasaki of Dave Molyneux/Patrick Farrance continued to lap under 20 minutes pushing the practice pace to an average speed of 114.748 mph. The TT newcomer Brian McCormack, Scott Wilson and Paul Shoesmith were involved in an accident at the Water Works Corner. Other incidents included TT newcomers, the Japanese competitor Takahiro Itami at the Jubilee Oak on Braddan Bridge and Brendan Cretu at the Nook. The 2009 Junior Manx Grand Prix winner Steven McIlvenna slipped-off at the nearby Governor's Bridge and Jenny Tinmouth at Sulby Bridge all without serious injury. Approaching Cruickshanks Corner, the passenger Keir Pedley fell from a sidecar outfit driven by Carl Fenwick sustaining leg injuries and was taken to Ramsey Cottage Hospital by Ambulance.

Thursday evening practice
The Thursday evening practice session was delayed until 6:45 pm due to a series of road traffic accidents on the A18 Mountain Road. The first scheduled session was the sidecars to allow an extended track-time for the class and also to permit the solo competitors to test the new pit-lane speed limit first used for the 2009 Manx Grand Prix. The 600 cc DMR Kawasaki of Dave Molyneux/Patrick Farrance was first away from the end of the TT Grandstand pit-lane and recorded another lap under 20 minutes to continue to dominate the class with a time of 19 minutes and 36.36 seconds and average speed of 115.464 mph. The Monday evening practice leader for sidecar class, Klaus Klaffenböck/Dan Sayle with a 600 cc LCR Honda outfit also recorded a sub-20-minute lap at an average speed of 114.096 mph in the Thursday evening practice session. In the Superbike class, Ian Hutchinson was fastest during practice and recorded his first 130 mph lap with a time of 17 minutes and 23.51 seconds at an average speed of 130.165 mph. The fastest time in the Supersport class was set by Keith Amor riding a 600 cc Honda motorcycle at an average speed of 124.797 mph to move into third place on the Supersport practice leaderboard. With the 1000 cc Superstock class, the fastest time of the evening was recorded by Michael Rutter at an average speed of 127.564 mph. The TT newcomer sidecar outfit of Nigel Mayers/Joseph Shardlow crashed at Kate's Cottage during Thursday evening practice with the passenger taken to Noble’s Hospital by Medical Helicopter.

Friday evening practice
The Friday evening practice session on 4 June 2010 was delayed until 6:30 pm and the first competitor away from the TT Grandstand in the sidecar class was the 600 cc LCR Suzuki of John Holden/Andrew Winkle following the Thursday practice format to allow the solo competitors a further test of the new 60 km/h pit-lane speed limit. The fastest time of the evening in the Sidecar TT class was recorded by Klaus Klaffenböck/Dan Sayle with a time of 19 minutes and 56.64 seconds at an average speed of 113.508 mph. The sidecar crew of John Holden/Andrew Winkle recorded their first lap in practice under 20 minutes at an average speed of 113.224 mph to move into third place in the Sidecar TT practice leaderboard. The Superbike class continued to be denominated by Ian Hutchinson with the only 130 mph lap during Friday evening practice in a time of 17 minutes and 19.92 seconds at an average speed of 130.614 mph to claim pole position for the Superbike TT Race. The fastest time for the 600 cc Supersport TT was Michael Dunlop recording the first lap in practice under 18 minutes for the class in a time of 17 minutes and 54.63 seconds an average speed of 126.395 mph. The fastest time for the 1000 cc Superstock TT was also set by Michael Dunlop at an average speed of 128.324 mph to displace Ryan Farquhar from pole position for the class. The New Zealander Bruce Anstey stopped at Sulby Bridge during Friday evening practice and Guy Martin was delayed with mechanical problems at Ballacraine. A further practice session occurred after racing on Saturday 5 June 2010 for the Supersport and Superstock classes with the TT Zero motorcycles also completing their first practice lap. The fastest time was recorded by Rob Barber the winner of the 2009 TTXGP class at an average speed of 84.875 mph riding the Team AGNI Motors entry.

TT Race Week 2010

Results

Practice Times

Practice Times & Leaderboard Superbike/Senior TT
Plates; Black on White/Black on Yellow.

Practice Times & Leaderboard Supersport Junior TT

Practice Times and Leaderboard 600 cc Sidecar TT

Practice Times & Leaderboard Superstock TT

Race results

2010 Superbike TT final standings.
5 June 2010 6 Laps (236.38 Miles) TT Mountain Course.

Fastest Lap and New Class Record: Conor Cummins – 131.511 mph (17' 12.83) on lap 1.

2010 Sidecar TT Race 'A' TT final standings
5 June 2010 3 Laps (113.00 Miles) TT Mountain Course.

Fastest Lap: Dave Molyneux/Patrick Farrance – 115.284 mph (19' 38.20) on lap 3.

2010 Supersport Junior TT Race 1
7 June 2010 4 Laps (150.73 Miles) TT Mountain Course.

Fastest Lap and New Lap Record: Keith Amor – 126.909 mph (17' 50.28) on lap 4.

2010 Superstock TT final standings.
7 June 2010 4 Laps (150.73 Miles) TT Mountain Course.

Fastest Lap and New Lap Record: Ian Hutchinson – 130.741 mph (17' 18.91) on lap 4.

2010 Sidecar TT Race 'B' TT final standings
10 June 2010 3 Laps (113.00 Miles) TT Mountain Course.

Fastest Lap: Klaus Klaffenböck/Dan Sayle – 114.157 mph (19' 49.84) on lap 3.

2010 Supersport Junior TT Race 2
10 June 2010 4 Laps (150.73 Miles) TT Mountain Course.

Fastest Lap and New Lap Record: Michael Dunlop – 127.836 mph (17' 42.52) on lap 4.

2010 TT Zero Race
The inaugural TT Zero''' race was held in 2010. The class is for racing motorcycles "powered without the use of carbon based fuels and have zero toxic/noxious emissions."

10 June 2010 1 Lap (37.773 Miles) TT Mountain CourseFastest Lap and New Lap Record:Mark Miller – 96.820 mph (23' 22.89) on lap 1.2010 Senior TT final standings.
11 June 2010 4 Laps (150.73 Miles) TT Mountain Course (Reduced Race Distance).Fastest Lap'': Ian Hutchinson – 131.487 mph (17' 13.01) on lap 1.

2010 Isle of Man TT Championship Points Standings

2010 Joey Dunlop TT Champion Trophy

2010 TT Privateers Championship

 *denotes newcomer

Notes

External links

 2010 Isle of Man TT Races Circuit Guide

Isle of Man TT
Isle of Man TT
2010
2010 in motorcycle sport